Saving the Wildlife is an album by Mannheim Steamroller, released in 1986. It was written for the soundtrack of a PBS special by the same name, except for "Dolphins and Whales," which originally appeared on Fresh Aire VI as "Come Home to the Sea".

Track listing
"Rhinos and Elephants" (Africa)  – 4:07
"Dolphins and Whales" (Come Home to the Sea) (Originally released on Fresh Aire VI)– 4:50
"Wolfgang Amadeus Penguin" (Argentina) – 2:01
"Florida Suite: Barbeque" (USA)  – 2:13 
"Florida Suite: Everglades" (USA) – 1:46
"Florida Suite: Sunset" (USA) – 1:57
"Wolves" (USA)  – 3:05
"Tamarin Monkeys" (Rio de Janeiro) – 3:08
"Grizzly Bears" (USA)  – 2:58
"Tigers and Lions" (India) – 3:00
"Eagles" (USA) – 3:02
"Amanda Panda" (China) – 1:47
"Harp Seals" (Canada) – 1:35
All tracks composed by Chip Davis

Personnel
Jackson Berkey - keyboards
Chip Davis - drums, recorders
Joey Gulizia - ethnic percussion
Ron Agnew - guitar
Ric Swanson - percussion

References

1986 albums
Mannheim Steamroller albums
American Gramaphone soundtracks